A Flower Is a Lovesome Thing is the second studio album by American jazz pianist Vince Guaraldi (credited to the Vince Guaraldi Trio), released in the US by Fantasy Records in October 1957.

Background
A Flower Is a Lovesome Thing exhibits the trio's growth from the safer jazz style played in their self-titled album Vince Guaraldi Trio. Guaraldi employed the same musicians as he did for his debut album; guitarist Eddie Duran and bassist Dean Reilly. Guaraldi began exploring his personal style on the piano with these tracks before becoming recognized as a great jazz pianist in his following album Jazz Impressions of Black Orpheus (1962).

Critical reception
Guaraldi historian and author Derrick Bang ranks the album as one of the pianist's "prettiest," adding that it is "gentle and lyrical, as befits a collective theme that revolves around flora and changing seasons." AllMusic critic Scott Yanow said the album is one of Guaraldi's "better sets", adding that the pianist "plays...tastefully and with light swing, making this a program that is equally successful as both cool jazz and background music."

Track listing

Personnel
Vince Guaraldi Trio
Vince Guaraldi – piano
Eddie Duran – guitar
Dean Reilly – double bass

Additional
 Ralph J. Gleason – liner notes
 Phil De Lancie – digital remastering (1994)

Release history

External links

References 

Vince Guaraldi albums
1958 albums
Fantasy Records albums